Bear River First Nation (Mi'kmaq: L'sɨtkuk) is a Míkmaq First Nations band government located in both Annapolis County and Digby County, Nova Scotia. As of 2012, the Mi'kmaq population is 103 on-Reserve, and approximately 211 off-Reserve.

Bear River First Nation lies adjacent to the village of Bear River, Nova Scotia. It has a church, Saint Anne's, completed in 1836, and a school which serves toddlers and preschoolers. The Mi'kmaq language is taught to children attending the school. A health centre was established in 1998.

History
Archaeological evidence suggests the community has existed in the area for 2,000 to 4,000 years. It lies in the ancient District of Kespukwitk, a part of the Mi'kmaq nation. The people of Bear River are the Indigenous community whose ancestors welcomed Pierre Dugua, Sieur de Mons, Samuel de Champlain and others who settled at Port-Royal in 1605. The sakmow, or chief, at that time was Henri Membertou who befriended the French. The area around Port-Royal was the traditional summering site of Membertou's people.

The community were known as canoe builders who used their craft for fishing and hunting porpoise, in the Annapolis Basin and Bay of Fundy. Oil rendered from the porpoise was sold as a machine lubricant into the early part of the twentieth century.

Tourism
Each summer the Bear River First Nation Heritage & Cultural Centre offers authentic cultural immersion in the life and traditions of the Mi'kmaq, featuring hands-on craft-making workshops.

Composition
The Bear River First Nation is composed of three parts as shown, of which the largest is regularly occupied:

Notable people 

 shalan joudry – poet and playwright

See also
 Peter Paul Toney Babey

References

External links
 Bear River First Nation
 Seven Paddles - The L'sitkuk to Kejimkujik project 
 "Learning About Native Heritage At The Bear River"
 Articles about the Bear River community
 Bear River artifacts in Nova Scotia Museum

First Nations governments in Atlantic Canada
First Nations in Nova Scotia
Communities in Annapolis County, Nova Scotia
Communities in Digby County, Nova Scotia
Mi'kmaq in Canada